A boxing event at the 2014 Asian Games was held in the Seonhak Gymnasium in Incheon, South Korea from September 24, 2014 to October 3, 2014.

Schedule

Medalists

Men

Women

Medal table

Participating nations
A total of 216 athletes from 34 nations competed in boxing at the 2014 Asian Games:

References

External links
Results
Official website

 
2014
2014 Asian Games events
Asian Games
2014 Asian Games